Shumpert may refer to:

 Iman Shumpert, American basketball player
 Mert Shumpert, American-Turkish basketball player
 Ruben Shumpert, accomplice of Ali Muhammad Brown in a bank fraud crime, later enrolled by the jihadist group Al-Shabaab in Somalia
 Terry Shumpert, American baseball player
 Shumpert, a Woodbury survivor and The Governor's crossbow-bearing henchman in the fictional TV series, The Walking Dead 

 In fiction
 Holly Shumpert, a fictional character of the American sitcom  The King of Queens, ran on CBS from 1998 to 2007